Olivia Frances Culpo (born May 8, 1992) is an American model, fashion influencer, social media personality, and actress. After winning the Miss Rhode Island USA competition, she went on to be crowned Miss USA, and then Miss Universe in 2012.

Early life and education 
Olivia Frances Culpo was born May 8, 1992 in Cranston, Rhode Island, to parents Susan and Peter Culpo. She is the middle child of five siblings. Her restaurateur father co-owns businesses around Boston. She was raised in the Edgewood neighborhood of Cranston, and is of Italian descent with some Irish ancestry from her mother's side.

Culpo attended St. Mary Academy – Bay View and later, Boston University, but did not graduate. She began studying the cello in second grade, and has played in the Rhode Island Philharmonic Youth Orchestra, the Rhode Island Philharmonic Chamber Ensemble, the Bay View Orchestra, and the Rhode Island All-State Orchestra. She attended the Brevard Music Center, in Brevard, North Carolina for two summers, and has performed with the Boston Accompanietta.

Career

Pageantry
After winning the 2012 Miss Rhode Island USA competition on the first pageant she entered, she went on to win the Miss USA pageant on June 3, 2012.

On July 6, 2012, the city of Cranston, Rhode Island held a homecoming celebration for Culpo for her pageant win. At an outdoor ceremony held at Cranston City Hall, Mayor Allan Fung presented Culpo with the key to the city.

Culpo represented the United States at the 61st Miss Universe pageant that was held on December 19, 2012, in Las Vegas, Nevada. She won the competition, becoming the eighth representative from the United States to win the title and the first since Brook Lee was crowned Miss Universe 1997. Culpo has also become the first Rhode Islander to win the title. She succeeded outgoing titleholder Leila Lopes from Angola.

In January 2013, Culpo visited Indonesia for three weeks and helped crown the winner of Puteri Indonesia 2013 on February 1 in Jakarta. She also visited Yogyakarta, Surabaya, and Bali during her visit. In Jakarta, Culpo hosted a discussion with young Indonesians for the United Nations Population Fund on HIV and youth prevention at the United States Embassy's cultural center of America.

On August 25, 2013, Cranston's city council approved a resolution adding Culpo's name to Albert Avenue, which runs the length between Broad Street and Narragansett Boulevard in Edgewood.

On September 10, 2013, Culpo walked in the Sherri Hill fashion show held at the Trump Tower in New York City. Culpo was in India from September 27 until October 6. 

On November 9, 2013, she crowned Gabriela Isler of Venezuela as her successor. In doing so, she became the 3rd Miss Universe from the USA to pass the title off to Venezuela, after Shawn Weatherly in 1981 and Chelsi Smith in 1996.

Outside pageantry
Culpo became a social media personality after gaining a significant following on Twitter, Instagram and YouTube, and has partnered and collaborated with several beauty and fashion brands like L'Oréal, Kipling, and Uberliss as an influencer. Culpo was also featured in the Sports Illustrated Swimsuit Issue, and appeared on the cover of the 2020 issue alongside Jasmine Sanders and Kate Bock. She also appeared in the reality television show Model Squad (2018). In addition, Culpo had roles in the films The Other Woman, I Feel Pretty, Reprisal, and was cast as female lead in Venus as a Boy.

In August 2017, Culpo opened a restaurant with her family in Rhode Island.

Filmography

Film

Television

Music videos

References

External links

 

1992 births
Fashion influencers
Social media influencers
American Internet celebrities
Miss Universe winners
Miss USA 2012 delegates
Miss USA winners
Miss Universe 2012 contestants
2007 beauty pageant contestants
21st-century Miss Teen USA delegates
American beauty pageant winners
Female models from Rhode Island
American female models
Actresses from Rhode Island
American film actresses
American people of Irish descent
American people of Italian descent
Boston University people
Living people
People from Cranston, Rhode Island
Participants in American reality television series